The 1980 Kent State Golden Flashes football team was an American football team that represented Kent State University in the Mid-American Conference (MAC) during the 1980 NCAA Division I-A football season. In their third season under head coach Ron Blackledge, the Golden Flashes compiled a 3–8 record (3–6 against MAC opponents), finished in eighth place in the MAC, and were outscored by all opponents by a combined total of 279 to 159.

The team's statistical leaders included Ron Pittman with 485 rushing yards, Pat Gladfelter with 745 passing yards, and Darren Brown with 419 receiving yards. Defensive back Charlie Grandjean was selected as a first-team All-MAC player.

Schedule

References

Kent State
Kent State Golden Flashes football seasons
Kent State Golden Flashes football